is a passenger railway station located in the city of Kawagoe, Saitama, Japan, operated by the private railway operator Tōbu Railway.

Lines
Rapid Express, Express, Semi Express, and Local services stop at this station.

Station layout
The station consists of a single island platform serving two tracks, with an elevated station building located above the platforms.

Platforms

History
The station opened on 27 October 1916 as  coinciding with the extension of the Tōjō Railway line from Kawagoe to Sakado-machi (now Sakado Station). It was renamed Kasumigaseki on 14 January 1930 following the opening of the nearby Kasumigaseki Country Club in 1929. Later, in 1940, the former name was reassigned to Matoba Station on the Kawagoe Line.

A track operated by Saitama Prefecture formerly led from this station to a gravel excavation site on the nearby Iruma River, but this was closed in 1957.

The platform was previously linked to the station building on the south side by an underground passage, but in 2007, the station was rebuilt with the station facilities relocated above the platforms. In 2008, an entrance was also added on the north side of the station.

From 17 March 2012, station numbering was introduced on the Tōbu Tōjō Line, with Kasumigaseki Station becoming "TJ-23".

From March 2023, Kasumigaseki Station became an Rapid Express service stop following the abolishment of the Rapid (快速, Kaisoku) services and reorganization of the Tōbu Tōjō Line services.

Passenger statistics
In fiscal 2019, the station was used by an average of 29,021 passengers daily.  The passenger figures for previous years are as shown below.

Surrounding area
 Iruma River
 Tokyo International University
 Kasumigaseki Senior High School
 Tobu Kasumi Driving School
 Kawagoe West Culture Hall

See also
 List of railway stations in Japan
 Kasumigaseki Station (Tokyo), a station in Tokyo with the same name

References

External links

  

Tobu Tojo Main Line
Stations of Tobu Railway
Railway stations in Kawagoe, Saitama
Railway stations in Japan opened in 1916